Brundle may refer to:

 Brundle (surname)
 Brundle (malware), an ELF-infector virus; see Linux malware
 Orangeville/Brundle Field Aerodrome (TC id: COB4), Ontario, Canada; the Brundle airfield serving Orangeville
 Brundle Group, a car sales company from Robin Brundle

See also

 
 Brundlefly (disambiguation)